Esko Nevalainen (10 May 1925 – 23 July 2008) was a Finnish film cinematographer . His career started in 1945 when he began to work as an assistant for a production company called Filmitaito.

Nevalainen got his first major job as a cinematographer in a Matti Kassila film Elokuu (1956). For this film, he also received his first of four a Jussi Award for best cinematography. Nevalainen and Kassila collaborated several times  over the years, in such movies as Punainen viiva (1959), Kaasua, komisario Palmu! (1961) and Natalia (1979).

Selected filmography 

 Villi Pohjola (1955)
 Jokin ihmisessä (1956)
 Lasisydän (1959)
 Naiset, jotka minulle annoit (1962)
 Sissit (1963)
 Käpy selän alla (1966)
 Kuuma kissa? (1968)
 Asfalttilampaat (1968)
 Kuningas, jolla ei ollut sydäntä (1982)
 Kun Hunttalan Matti Suomen osti (1984)

References

1925 births
2008 deaths
People from Kittilä
Finnish cinematographers